The Basta Movement is a political party in São Tomé and Príncipe. The party was created on June 7, 2022. They ran in the 2022 São Tomé and Príncipe legislative elections and won a total of 6,874 votes, making the party the third largest in the country. During this election candidates from the Democratic Convergence Party (PCD) joined the movement and ran under its banner. The leader of the party is Salvador Ramos.

References

External links
 Official website

Political parties in Africa
Political parties established in 2022